Hikayat Raja-raja Pasai (حكاية راج-راج ڤاسا translated as “Chronicle of the Kings of Pasai”) is perhaps the earliest work in Malay on the first Malay-Muslim kingdom of Samudera-Pasai. In the story, Merah Silu met Muhammad in his dream and accepted conversion to Islam. The book is believed to have been composed around the late 14th century.

See also
 List of Hikayat

References

External links
 Dispersing God's shadows - Reflections on the translation of Arabic political concepts into Malay and Indonesian

Malay-language literature
History of Islam in Indonesia
Books about monarchs